José Manuel Oliveira (born 5 May 1967) is a Spanish former racing cyclist. He rode in the 1991 Tour de France.

References

External links
 

1967 births
Living people
Spanish male cyclists
Place of birth missing (living people)
Sportspeople from the Province of A Coruña
Cyclists from Galicia (Spain)